The following is a list of Delaware State Hornets football seasons for the football team that has represented Delaware State University in NCAA competition.

Results

In 1987, Delaware State was defeated by Howard 12–7, finishing with a 4–1 record in conference play, second to Howard. Howard was later forced to forfeit all victories that season for using ineligible players, moving Delaware State to 5–0, at which time the MEAC stripped the title and awarded it to Delaware State.
In 1991, Delaware State was defeated by Bethune-Cookman 28–20, however, it was determined that BCU used an ineligible player and the Wildcats were forced to forfeit the game. The victory gave Delaware State a 5–1 conference record, tying them with North Carolina A&T, who the Hornets had beaten earlier in the season, for a share of the conference championship.
In 2003, Ben Blacknall coached games 1–6 and was fired with an 0–6 record. Butch Posey was promoted to head coach for games 7–11 and finished with a 1–4 record.

References

Notes

 
Delaware State
Delaware State Hornets football seasons